The Fiat A.70 was an air cooled radial engine with seven cylinders developed by the Italian engineering company Fiat Aviazione in the 1930s. The engine powered a number of Italian light competition and prototype aircraft.

Design and development
The A.70 was developed by Fiat Aviazione, part of Fiat S.p.A., as one of a number of related small radial engines. It debuted at the Challenge International de Tourisme 1934, powering a number of the competitors. It was connected to the propeller by direct drive, often through a NACA cowling.

Applications
 Breda Ba.42
 Caproni PS.1
 Fiat G.5
 Nardi FN.305
 Nardi FN.310

Specifications (A.70S)

See also

References

Citations

Bibliography
 
 
 
 

Air-cooled aircraft piston engines
1930s aircraft piston engines
A.70
Radial engines